Superbuick is the second album from heavy metal band Mushroomhead. The album was released independently in 1996. Most of the songs were later remastered on XX which was initially released by Eclipse Records, then through Universal Records after some slight modifications and two additional songs. This is their first album with Pig Benis on bass and the last with DJ Virus on samples/programming. Previous bassist (and Pig Benis' brother) Mr. Murdernickel has songwriting credits for a few tracks, as revealed when the songs were recorded and released again for XX.

The album was repressed in 2002 along with their self-titled album and M3, though some major retailers do not carry them. All three can be purchased at live shows.

To commemorate the album's 20th anniversary, a special one night only concert was held at the Agora Theatre on September 16, 2016, where the band played the album in its entirety. Digipack and vinyl pressings were also produced the same year to commemorate the album's anniversary.

Superbuick uses these movie samples which have acknowledgments in the CD inlay:
Twin Peaks: Fire Walk with Me
Ed Wood (film)
Psych-Out
Se7en

Track listing

Personnel 

Mushroomhead
 Jeffrey Hatrix - clean vocals
 Jason Popson - harsh vocals
 John Sekula - guitars
 Richie Moore - guitars
 Jack Kilcoyne - bass
 Tom Schmitz - keyboards
 Joe Lenkey - samples, programming
 Steve Felton - drums

Production
 Bill Korecky - co-producer, engineer
 Patrick Lewis - additional engineer

Artwork
 Vanessa Solowiow - photography
 Rich Moore - layout and design

References

1996 albums
Mushroomhead albums